Drogowa Trasa Średnicowa (DTŚ, can be translated as diametral highway or central highway) is a controlled-access highway in Silesian Voivodeship, Poland. The DTŚ is entirely a dual carriageway with a minimum of 3 lanes in each direction. It is one of the most important roads of the Upper Silesian Industrial Region.

The DTŚ runs most of its course parallel to the A4 motorway but, unlike the A4, the DTŚ provides access to the congested centers of the Upper Silesian Metropolitan Union with 26 junctions (A4 has 6 junctions in the comparable section).

The DTŚ runs from Katowice through Chorzów and Świętochłowice, Ruda Śląska, Zabrze to Gliwice.

The construction of road resulted in a considerable improvement in the traffic of the highly urbanized area of Upper Silesian Metropolitan Union. It shortened the road distance between Katowice and Gliwice by 26%, travelling time by 76%, consumption of gasoline by 47%, the number of road accidents by 82%, exploitation costs by 39%, and air pollution by 50%.

History of construction
The DTŚ is the largest road investment ever carried out by a local government in Poland. The construction started in 1986. In 1990, due to Polish financial problems, the work practically halted. Since 1994 the budget for construction increased thanks to the European Investment Bank (EIB) that provided a guarantee of funding. Since 1999 the construction of the DTŚ has been a shared responsibility of the Polish government, local government of the Silesian Voivodeship and of the cities through which the road runs, and work progresses steadily. A local organization in Gliwice has been protesting against proposed layout of the road through the city center (on ecological basis).  The construction has been completed in 2016.

An eastern extension of the DTŚ is planned for a more distant future. This branch would run from Katowice to Mysłowice, Sosnowiec, Będzin and Dąbrowa Górnicza.

References

Roads in Poland
Buildings and structures in Silesian Voivodeship